The Heavy Soul Sessions is the thirteenth studio album by Djam Karet, released on October 17, 2010 by HC Productions.

Track listing

Personnel 
Adapted from The Heavy Soul Sessions liner notes.

Djam Karet
 Gayle Ellett – organ, synthesizer, mellotron, mixing, mastering
 Mike Henderson – electric guitar, electronics, engineering
 Aaron Kenyon – 5-string bass guitar, electronics
 Mike Murray – electric guitar, electronics
 Chuck Oken, Jr. – drums, engineering

Production and additional personnel
 Djam Karet – production

Release history

References

External links 
 The Heavy Soul Sessions at Discogs (list of releases)
 The Heavy Soul Sessions at Bandcamp

2010 albums
Djam Karet albums